Fotokol is a town and commune in Logone-et-Chari Department, Far North Region, Cameroon. It is home to Fotokol High School.

In 2014, the Gamboru Ngala massacre by jihadist group Boko Haram killed 300 people, endangering Fotokol residents as well.

As of June 2014, "soldiers and paramilitary officers have been deployed in ... [Fotokol] to provide security for residents and allow children to safely attend school."

In September 2014, the United Nations announced that it was making efforts to move 5,000 refugees staying in Fotokol to safer locations, to avoid cross-border incursions by Nigerian insurgents. Over 8,000 refugees had already been moved to the Minawo refugee camp.

On 29 and 30 January 2015, fighting between Chadian soldiers and Boko Haram was reported in Fotokol and surrounding areas. On 4 February 2015, Boko Haram launched a counterattack, to a Chadian assault, on Fotokol, killing 81 civilians, 13 Chadian and 6 Cameroonian soldiers. Boko Haram launched a series of suicide attacks in the town, leading to the region's governor to place restrictions on Islamic veils.

On 6 January 2020, a bombing in Gamboru on the bridge which connects it to Fotokol killed at least 30 people.

See also
Communes of Cameroon

References

 Site de la primature - Élections municipales 2002 
 Contrôle de gestion et performance des services publics communaux des villes camerounaises - Thèse de Donation Avele, Université Montesquieu Bordeaux IV 
 Charles Nanga, La réforme de l’administration territoriale au Cameroun à la lumière de la loi constitutionnelle n° 96/06 du 18 janvier 1996, Mémoire ENA.

External links 
Students chat in the courtyard of a high school in Fotokol
Le Monde : Sept morts au Cameroun après une incursion de Boko Haram

 Fotokol
Communes of Far North Region (Cameroon)